Nau, NAU or nau may refer to:

Organisations 
Nau (clothing retailer), an outdoor apparel company
Nanjing Agricultural University, China
National American University
National Anti-crisis Management (from ), a shadow government created in Belarus in October 2020
National Aviation University, Ukraine
North American Union
Northern Arizona University

People 
Claude Nau (died 1605), secretary of Mary, Queen of Scots
François l'Olonnais (Jean-David Nau, c.1630–1669), French pirate active in the Caribbean during the 1660s
Dana S. Nau (born 1951), computer scientist
Sioeli Nau (1825–1895) also known as Joel Nau, Tongan Methodist minister
François Nau (1864–1931), French Syriacist
John L. Nau III, Texas businessman and historical preservationist

Places 
Nau, Tajikistan, a town in Sughd Province of Tajikistan
Spitamen District in Sughd Province of Tajikistan, formerly known as Nau District
Nau (Danube), a river of Baden-Württemberg and Bavaria, Germany, tributary of the Danube

Music 
Nautilus Pompilius (band), sometimes abbreviated to Nau
Nau, a Brazilian band fronted by Vange Leonel, active from 1985 to 1989
Nau (album), 1987 album by the aforementioned band

Other uses 
Lepidium oleraceum, a plant endemic to New Zealand
Carrack, a three- or four-masted sailing ship
Nauru, license plate and UNDP country code
Nauruan language ISO 639 code
Napuka Airport (IATA code NAU) on the island nation of Napuka
Bharatiya Nau Sena, the native name of the Indian Navy
Bangladesh Nou-Bahini, the native name of the Bangladeshi Navy